The Rutter Group, founded by William Rutter, with Linda A. Diamond, is a business of Thomson Reuters that publishes materials for lawyers and judges in the United States, with a particular focus on California.  The Rutter Group is well known for its Rutter Group Practice Guides, which are written and edited by famous lawyers and judges. Courts have cited these treatises in almost 8,000 legal opinions, and they have been called the 'bible' for litigators.

Many of the cases that the treatises cite point back directly to the Rutter text as the original source of the legal principle applied. When this occurs, the Rutter treatises include the parenthetical "citing text" when listing the cases.

Because the publications are non-binding, courts may sometimes expressly decline to follow them. However, both California and federal courts have repeatedly identified Rutter treatises as "well-respected" interpretations of the law, which may be cited as "redoubtable" authority. The California Court of Appeal has treated the existence of conflicting Rutter Group authority as strong evidence that a legal question was unsettled and therefore not an appropriate basis for sanctioning an attorney.

The Rutter Group also sponsors panel discussions regarding recent changes in the law, and the judges it hires to participate in these events must disclose the compensation they receive because it could potentially be a conflict of interests.

Rutter treatises
The Rutter Group now publishes more than twenty-five treatises, which are available both in print and through Westlaw. They are considered one of the primary reasons that many attorneys subscribe to Westlaw instead of its competitor, Lexis.

Subjects include:
Administrative law
Alternative dispute resolution
Bankruptcy
Civil appeals and writs
Civil procedure before trial
Civil trials and evidence
Corporations
Employment litigation
Enforcing judgments and debts
Family law
Federal civil procedure before trial
Federal civil trials and evidence
Federal employment litigation
Federal Ninth Circuit civil appellate practice
Insurance litigation
Landlord–tenant
Personal injury
Privacy law
Probate
Professional responsibility
Real property transactions

References

External links
 Rutter Group Home Page

West (publisher)
Thomson Reuters

ja:FindLaw